Matthew Ebden was the defending champion, however he chose not to participate.

Go Soeda won the title, defeating Tatsuma Ito in the final, 6–4, 7–5.

Seeds

Draw

Finals

Top half

Bottom half

References 
 Main draw
 Qualifying draw

Dunlop World Challenge
2014 MS
2014 ATP Challenger Tour